Josephine Rosa Beatrice Wright (born September 5, 1942) is an American musicologist, recognized for her contributions to the study of African-American music and women in music. Since 1981, she has been a professor of music and the Josephine Lincoln Morris Professor of Black Studies at the College of Wooster in Ohio. In 2015, she was presented the Society for American Music's Lifetime Achievement Award.

Biography 
Wright was born in Detroit, Michigan, in 1942. She earned a bachelor's degree in music from the University of Missouri, a master's degree in music from Pius XII Academy in Florence, a master's degree in music from the University of Missouri, and a doctoral degree in historical musicology from New York University. She was the second African American to earn a doctorate in music, after Eileen Southern, her mentor and collaborator.

Wright served as an assistant professor at Harvard University's Department of Afro-American studies from 1976 to 1981. In 1981, she file a suit against Harvard with the Equal Employment Opportunity Commission, accusing the institution of race and gender discrimination. That year, she joined the faculty at the College of Wooster, where she was named a professor of music and Josephine Lincoln Morris Professor of Black Studies. As of 2020, she continued to hold this position.

Wright is recognized as an expert in African-American music, women in music, black women's history, and Western music history. With Eileen Southern, she co-authored African-American Traditions in Song, Sermon, Tale, and Dance, 1600s-1920 (1990) and Images: Iconography of Music in African-American Culture, 1770s-1920s (2000). Wright served as editor of American Music from 1994 to 1997. In 1997, she was named to the national artistic directorate of the American Classical Music Hall of Fame and Museum in Cincinnati.

In 2015, the Society for American Music presented Wright with a Lifetime Achievement Award. In 2019, she was elected an honorary member of the American Musicological Society “as a pioneer in the study and teaching of women’s and African-Americans’ participation in musical life."

Selected works

Books

Book chapters

Journal articles

References 

1942 births
Living people
University of Missouri alumni
New York University alumni
Harvard University faculty
College of Wooster faculty
American musicologists
African-American women academics
American women academics
African-American academics
21st-century African-American people
20th-century African-American people
20th-century African-American women
21st-century African-American women